Eucereon latifascia is a moth of the subfamily Arctiinae. It was described by Francis Walker in 1856. It is found in Guatemala, Honduras, Panama, Venezuela, Peru and Amazonas, Brazil.

References

 

latifascia
Moths described in 1856